Pu Qifeng (born 3 January 1986) is a male Chinese sports shooter. He won the silver medal for 10 m air pistol at the 2014 Asian Games.

References

External links

1986 births
Living people
Asian Games medalists in shooting
Shooters at the 2010 Asian Games
Shooters at the 2014 Asian Games
Chinese male sport shooters
Olympic shooters of China
Shooters at the 2016 Summer Olympics
Asian Games gold medalists for China
Asian Games silver medalists for China
Medalists at the 2010 Asian Games
Medalists at the 2014 Asian Games
ISSF pistol shooters
Sport shooters from Sichuan
21st-century Chinese people